The Lüdinghausen railway station is a station of the Dortmund-Enschede railway located at the Westphalian city of Lüdinghausen. It was opened in Summer 1875. Trains of the line RB51 call at Lüdinghausen. In December 2011, the Deutsche Bahn AG stopped selling tickets in Lüdinghausen.

The railway station consists of two signal boxes with mechanic operation, (Ln (pointsman) and Lf (signalman)), two level crossings (Olfener Straße and Seppenrader Straße), two platform tracks with a centre platform, two dead-end sidings with buffer stops, and six sets of points, out of which four are remote-controlled, one is operated by wagon shunters with a nearby lever, and one is out of order. A local distillery is connected to the station.

Photo gallery

References 

Railway stations in North Rhine-Westphalia
Railway stations in Germany opened in 1875
Lüdinghausen